Murder Goes to College is a 1937 American comedy film directed by Charles Reisner and written by Brian Marlow, Eddie Welch and Robert Wyler. The film stars Roscoe Karns, Marsha Hunt, Lynne Overman, Buster Crabbe, Astrid Allwyn and Harvey Stephens. The film was released on February 24, 1937, by Paramount Pictures.

Karns' and Overman's private-eye characters were reteamed for a sequel, Partners in Crime, later that year.

Plot

Cast 
Roscoe Karns as Sim Perkins
Marsha Hunt as Nora Barry
Lynne Overman as Henry 'Hank' Hyer
Buster Crabbe as Strike Belno
Astrid Allwyn as Greta Barry
Harvey Stephens as Paul Broderick
Purnell Pratt as President Arthur L. McShean
Barlowe Borland as Dean Wilfred Everett Olney
Earle Foxe as Tom Barry
Anthony Nace as Howard Sayforth
Ellen Drew as Lil 
Nick Lukats as Drunk
Jack Chapin as Taxi Driver
Charles C. Wilson as Inspector Simpson

References

External links 
 

1937 films
Paramount Pictures films
American comedy films
1937 comedy films
Films directed by Charles Reisner
American black-and-white films
1930s English-language films
1930s American films